Melanodendron is a genus of trees in the family Asteraceae, with only one species, Melanodendron integrifolium (black cabbage tree), native to the island of Saint Helena (South Atlantic Ocean). It is related to the Saint Helenan gumwoods (Commidendrum spp.) and is the most common of the remaining cabbage tree species of Saint Helena, although it is considered endangered due to the restricted population size.

See also
Flora of Saint Helena

References

 Cronk, Q.C.B. (1995) The endemic Flora of St Helena. Anthony Nelson Ltd, Oswestry.

Monotypic Asteraceae genera
Flora of Saint Helena
Astereae
Endangered plants